Andrew James Gilmour  (born March 1964) is CEO of the Berghof Foundation. He was formerly United Nations Assistant Secretary-General for Human Rights, until 2019, and also served as Director for Political, Peacekeeping, Humanitarian and Human Rights affairs in the Executive Office of the Secretary-General, from 2012 to 2016.

Family
Andrew Gilmour is the youngest son of the British cabinet minister and political thinker, Lord (Ian) Gilmour of Craigmillar and Lady Caroline Montagu Douglas Scott (daughter of the 8th Duke of Buccleuch). His siblings are the historian Sir David Gilmour, the conductor Oliver Gilmour, the restaurateur Christopher Gilmour, and Jane Pleydell-Bouverie, Festival Director of the Chalke Valley History Festival. He is married to medical doctor and author Emma Williams. They have four children: Archie b.1993, Xan b. 1996, Catriona b. 1999, and Sholto b. 2001.

Education
Gilmour was educated at Eton and Balliol College, Oxford, where he read Modern History and won the Gladstone Memorial Prize (1986) for his thesis on The Changing Reactions of the British press to Mussolini, 1935–40. He undertook a master's degree at the London School of Economics in Government and International Relations during 1986–7.

UN career
Gilmour joined the United Nations in 1989 and worked in Afghanistan, Iraq, South Sudan, Middle East, West Africa, and the Balkans. In 2016, Ban ki-Moon appointed him UN Assistant Secretary-General for Human Rights, a post he held for over three years until the end of 2019, when he left the UN aged 55. During this period he was assigned the role of UN system-wide focal point for dealing with reprisals and intimidation that are carried out, usually by Governments, against individuals or NGOs who have cooperated with or seek to cooperate with the UN on human rights issues. He was a vocal defender of human rights activists who are under growing threats and pressure for their work.

He has spoken out against human rights violations carried out against the Rohingya people of Myanmar, the Palestinians, the Syrian people and victims in many other countries including China, Egypt, Libya and the Philippines. These followed in particular after his visits to Yemen, Democratic Republic of Congo, South Sudan, Kenya, Liberia, Mali, Burkina Faso, Central African Republic, Afghanistan, Kyrgyzstan, Tajikistan, Honduras, and Colombia. 

He has also been an advocate in favour of LGBT rights, victims of torture, rape survivors especially among the Yazidis and Rohingya, and indigenous peoples’ rights.

Gilmour was appointed Companion of the Order of St Michael and St George (CMG) in the 2020 Birthday Honours for services to human rights.

Publications 
Gilmour published a short history of the UN's involvement in the Middle East from 1945 to 2015.  He has also published in the Financial Times, the New York Times, the Guardian,  Bloomberg, The Nation, and other world publications, including in Africa and Latin America.

He also published “The future of human rights: A view from the UN,”  in the Journal of Ethics and International Affairs.

References

1964 births
Living people
People educated at Eton College
Alumni of Balliol College, Oxford
Alumni of the London School of Economics
British humanitarians
British officials of the United Nations
Companions of the Order of St Michael and St George